This page lists Japan-related articles with romanized titles beginning with the letters W and X. For names of people, please list by surname (i.e., "Tarō Yamada" should be listed under "Y", not "T"). Please also ignore particles (e.g. "a", "an", "the") when listing articles (i.e., "A City with No People" should be listed under "City").

Wa
W3m
Wa (Japan)
Wabi-sabi
Wachi, Kyoto
Wadayama, Hyōgo
Wado Ryu
Wadomari, Kagoshima
Wajiki, Tokushima
Wajima, Ishikawa
Waka (poetry)
Wakamiya, Fukuoka
Wakasa Province
Wakasa, Tottori
Koichi Wakata
Wakatsuki Reijirō
Bokusui Wakayama
Wakayama Prefecture
Wakayama, Wakayama
Wake District, Okayama
Wake, Okayama
Waki, Tokushima
Waki, Yamaguchi
Wakizashi
Wakkanai, Hokkaidō
Wakō, Saitama
Walkman
Wall of 1.03 million yen and 1.30 million yen
Waluigi
Wanouchi, Gifu
Warabi, Saitama
Wards of Japan
Warichi
Wario
Wario's Woods
Wario Land II
Wario Land 3
Wario Land 4
WarioWare (series)
WarioWare, Inc.: Mega Microgame$!
WarioWare, Inc.: Mega Party Game$!
WarioWare: Touched!
WarioWare: Twisted!
WarioWare: Smooth Moves
Wario World
Wasabi
Wasabi (film)
Waseda University
Kazumi Watanabe
Ken Watanabe (actor)
On Watanabe
Yoshinori Watanabe
Watarai District, Mie
Watarai, Mie
Yuu Watase
Water supply and sanitation in Japan
Wazuka, Kyoto

We–Wi
Weekly Shonen Jump
Welcome to Pia Carrot
West Japan Railway Company
White Day
Whiteout (2000 film)
William Adams (sailor)
William S. Clark
Wind: A Breath of Heart
Winny
Wish (manga)
Witch Hunter Robin

Wo–Wr
Wolf's Rain
Women in Japan
Wonder Boy
Wonder Boy in Monster Land
WonderSwan
WonderSwan Color
Wooden fish
World Domination (Band-Maid album)
World Record (The Animatrix)
World War II
WOWOW
Wrecking Crew (video game)

X
X (manga)
X Japan
X-Day (manga)
Francis Xavier
Xenogears
Xenosaga
xxxHolic

W